Sydney Z. Spiesel (b. 1940) is a pediatrician specializing in adolescent medicine on the clinical faculty of the Yale University School of Medicine.

Spiesel is a regular commentator for Slate magazine and National Public Radio.  He is married to legal professor and author Christina O. Spiesel.

Career
Spiesel has for many years operated a busy pediatrics practice in New Haven, Connecticut.

Spiesel is the inventor of a shampoo that makes lice eggs (nits) fluoresce under ultraviolet light, so making them more visible.

Education
Spiesel received his M.D. and Ph.D. from Yale University in 1975.

For his undergraduate work, Spiesel attended Shimer College, then located in Mount Carroll, Illinois.  He enrolled through the school's early entrance program, which since 1950 has allowed students to matriculate who have not received a high school diploma.  He graduated from Shimer in 1961.  In 2012, Spiesel was named one of the first three Shimer alumni to receive the school's Alumni Service Award.

References

American pediatricians
Slate (magazine) people
American medical journalists
Living people
Shimer College alumni
Year of birth missing (living people)